Dickson Jere is a Zambian lawyer (barrister), journalist, published author and renowned political analyst specializing on African affairs. He previously served as senior advisor and spokesman of Zambia's Fourth President Rupiah Bwezani Banda. He has also sat on a number of government committees dealing with the economic sector of the country. He sits on the boards of various companies. 
 
Jere is a Lawyer and Advocate of the High Court for Zambia, having obtained an LLB degree from the University of Zambia and a Bar Practicing Certificate from the Zambia Institute of Advanced Legal Education (ZIALE). Jere is a double master's degree holder; he holds the prestigious Masters In Intellectual Property (MIP) from Africa University in Zimbabwe and another Masters of Laws Degree (LLM) in Human Rights from Lusaka University and scooped the best graduating student award (2017). He is an Associate in a premier law firm, Mvunga Associates, where he specializes in Litigation, Business Advisory and General Counsel. As a practising lawyer, he has played various roles as an official, lawyer and advisor in various issues concerning mining in Zambia and other Southern African countries. He has represented a number of mining companies on wide range of issues that includes energy, taxation, environment and disputes arising from development agreements with governments. He is also a practicing Arbitrator and member of the Chartered Institute of Arbitrators (UK) and a bonafide member of the Law Society of Zambia.

Journalism career
After his diploma in Journalism, Public Relations and Advertising graduation from Sir Evelyn Hone College of Applied Arts and Commerce, Lusaka, Dickson Jere joined Zambia's leading daily newspaper and tabloid, The Post, as a reporter in the mid-1990s and it was there that he honed his journalism skills.

Jere worked with a chain of international media organisations, including the Agence France Presse (AFP), BBC Africa Service, Radio France International (RFI), Africa Confidential, African Energy and South Africa's talk show Radio 702 where he regularly featured as a political commentator. Moreover, he has featured regularly on a number of radio and television stations in Southern Africa as an analyst discussing political and economic developments in the region.

Constitution Review Commissioner
In 2003, President Levy Patrick Mwanawasa, SC appointed Jere as a Commissioner on the Commission tasked to draft the country's constitution. The new Constitution was enacted into law in 2016. Prior to his appointment, Jere was serving as president of the Media Institute of Southern Africa (MISA) Zambia as well as board member of the Media Trust Fund. He also worked as lead consultant for the Access to Justice Program under the Ministry of Justice in Zambia where he was in charge of establishing a public relations wing and other customer care programs for the country's judiciary. Additionally, he worked as media advisor for the United Nations Economic Commission for Africa (Southern Africa regional office) as well as media liaison officer for the European Union Electoral Observation Mission to Zambia in 2001.

Work at State House
In November 2008, Dickson Jere was  appointed by Rupiah Banda, the fourth republican president of Zambia, to serve as Chief Analyst at State House in-charge of press and a year later promoted to the position of Special Assistant to the President for Press and Public Relations.

Professional memberships
Currently, Jere is a member of the Law Association of Zambia and the Media Institute of Southern Africa (MISA). He also sits on the Human Rights Committee of the Law Association of Zambia.

In March 2018, Dickson Jere was elected as the Honorary Secretary of the Chartered Institute of Arbitration (Zambia) at the annual general meeting.

Personal life and education
Jere was raised in the city of Lusaka where he attended Munali Secondary School where he excelled in the Debate Club and completed his Grade 12 in 1995. Dickson Jere, between 1996 and 1999 attended Sir Evelyn Hone College of Applied Arts and Commerce, Lusaka, for his Diploma in Journalism, Public Relations and Advertising. He later studied for his Bachelor of Laws (LLB) degree at the University of Zambia shortly before he was appointed to serve as press aide at State House.

He is a double master's degree holder; he holds the Masters In Intellectual Property (MIP) from Africa University in Zimbabwe and another Masters of Laws Degree (LLM) in Human Rights from Lusaka University and scooped the best graduating student award (2017).

On March 14, 2014, Jere was admitted to the bar after passing a Legal Practitioners Qualification Examination (LPQE) at the Zambia Institute of Advanced Legal Education, which is a prerequisite post-graduate certificate for one to practice law in Zambia.

Extra-curricular activities
Dickson Jere is involved in sports, currently holding the position of vice president for the Zambia Judo Federation and Patron of the Black Rhino Football Club. While serving as advisor to President Banda, he was also appointed coordinator of fundraising for the Zambia National Soccer Team. As part of his hobbies, Jere enjoys playing golf and volleyball.

Bibliography
In 2014, Jere published his book Inside the Presidency: The Trials & Tribulations of a Zambian Spin Doctor which received many reviews and wide coverage in the Zambian media as well as abroad. As a result of the book, Jere was involved in a number of book signing sessions and presentations.

Inside the Presidency: the Trials and Tribulations of a Zambian Spin Doctor is a chronicle of the goings-on at the centre of state power as told by an insider. It captures the intrigues at the presidency, specifically associated with the author's time serving retired President Rupiah Banda.

The book “inside the presidency” won the 2018 Tell Your Own Story Award for Zambian books.

Publications

References

21st-century Zambian lawyers
University of Zambia alumni
Living people
People from Lusaka
20th-century Zambian writers
Alumni of Munali Secondary School
Year of birth missing (living people)